Touch and Go is a 1986 American romantic comedy-drama film directed by Robert Mandel, starring Michael Keaton, María Conchita Alonso and Ajay Naidu.

Plot
Bobby Barbato is a pro ice hockey player in Chicago. As always, he expects cheering crowds and beautiful women coming after him. But one day, a gang of youths begin to mug him but he manages to fend them off and then catches the youngest member of the gang, Louis DeLeon. He then gives Louis a ride home and meets the boy's mother, a Hispanic woman named Denise. After a fight, Bobby moves on with his life but then he and Denise begin to fall for each other and Louis eventually becomes close friends with the hockey player.

Cast
 Michael Keaton as Bobby Barbato
 María Conchita Alonso as Denise DeLeon
 Ajay Naidu as Louis DeLeon
 John Reilly as Jerry Pepper
 Lara Jill Miller as Courtney
 Cynthia Cypert as 2nd Girl in Bar

Production
The film was wrapped in late 1984 and intended for a 1985 release but then shelved, due to a change of studio representation–from Universal to Tri-Star–as well as extensive rescoring and reassembling of promotional ads during post-production. Producer Stephen J. Friedman spent a year negotiating a switch in distributors from Universal to Tri-Star while the film was stuck in limbo.It was then released in late 1986.

References

External links
 
 
 
 
 

1980s romantic comedy-drama films
1986 films
1986 comedy films
1986 drama films
American ice hockey films
American romantic comedy-drama films
1980s English-language films
Films directed by Robert Mandel
Films scored by Georges Delerue
Films scored by Sylvester Levay
Films set in Chicago
Films shot in Chicago
TriStar Pictures films
1980s American films